Sister Outsider is a poetry duo that specializes in slam poetry or spoken word. Dominique Christina and Denice Frohman are both Women of the World Poetry Slam Champions. Their collaboration has brought them success over the last two years as they have been to over 90 universities, colleges, conferences, and many other spaces across the United States. Inspired by the life of Audre Lorde, their premise is to encourage students and people across all generations to understand the power of art. They believe art can be a form of activism and expression that goes well beyond the page. Aside from their vivid performances, Sister Outsider also offers workshops to help students with their poetry writing as well as the delivery aspect to slam poetry.

Poetry  
Christina and Frohman specialize in poetry about injustice amongst marginalized communities, people of color, and LGBTQ communities. Through poetry they break the silence and use it as a tool for social change on poverty issues and stereotypes amongst these communities . They stand against such margins of violent and unhealthy culture by going by the slogan, "We Exist. We Resist." Their use of spoken word and personal stories spark conversation and encourage discussion on political and social issues. Their ability to incorporate activism with writing is what makes this duo inspiring.

Reviews 
“Before Sister Outsider left the Wabash campus, students were already discussing how best to go about bringing them back again. Sister Outsider provided the campus with an extremely engaging and entertaining evening of stellar performances during an evening show that was filled to capacity. Thank you Sister Outsider, for providing such needed and appreciated work.”

-Professor Perez, History Dept., ShOUT & Unidos Por Sangre Student Org. Advisor, Wabash College

“Sister Outsider’s performance to packed audience at Dartmouth College was inspiring in its honesty, integrity and ability to use the spoken word as a platform for education, communication, and social change. Their performance and workshops provided a space for all students to think critically, question, and challenge the status quo. For students who feel outside the norm or at the margins of acceptance, Sister Outsider’s poetry and message reinforces the fact that their presence, position, and voice are equal in both legitimacy and importance. The strength of their poetry reminds everyone that no one should apologize for her/his place in the world, but rather demand the rights their humanity affords.”

-Dr. Fluri, Director, Women's and Gender Studies Program, Dartmouth College

References

External links
Official website

American spoken word poets
Entertainer duos
Year of birth missing (living people)
Living people